The 32nd RTHK Top 10 Gold Songs Awards was held on January 30, 2010 for the 2009 music season.  This marks the second time the Golden needle award was given to someone who is deceased, Danny Chan, with the first being Tang Ti-sheng in 1986.

Top 10 song awards
The top 10 songs (十大中文金曲) of 2009 are as follows.

Other awards

References

External links
 Official webpage

RTHK Top 10 Gold Songs Awards
Rthk Top 10 Gold Songs Awards, 2009
2010 in Hong Kong
2010 music awards